is a Japanese football player. He plays for Verspah Oita.

Career
Kento Yabuuchi joined J2 League club FC Gifu in 2017. In March 2020, Yabuuchi joined Japan Football League club Verspah Oita.

Club statistics
Updated to 22 February 2018.

References

External links
Profile at FC Gifu

1995 births
Living people
Osaka Sangyo University alumni
Association football people from Osaka Prefecture
People from Sakai, Osaka
Japanese footballers
J2 League players
J3 League players
Japan Football League players
Gamba Osaka players
FC Gifu players
Iwate Grulla Morioka players
Verspah Oita players
Association football forwards